The Bavarian Administration of State-Owned Palaces, Gardens and Lakes, also known as the Bavarian Palace Department, is a department of the finance ministry of the German state of Bavaria. Tracing its roots back into the 18th century, the administration is now best known for being in charge of Neuschwanstein Castle and the other 19th-century palaces built by Ludwig II of Bavaria.

The department is responsible for 45 historical monuments and ensembles. This number includes:
 9 residences such as Munich Residence and Würzburg Residence
 14 villas and palaces including Neuschwanstein Castle, Linderhof Palace, Herrenchiemsee
 10 fortified sites including medieval Nuremberg Castle
 memorials such as the Befreiungshalle in Kelheim and the Ruhmeshalle and Feldherrnhalle in Munich
 the Roman Catholic pilgrimage church St. Bartholomew's in Berchtesgaden
 theaters and opera houses including the Margravial Opera House and the Cuvilliés Theatre

It is also responsible for 27 historical gardens like Englischer Garten in Munich and 21 lakes, most notably Chiemsee, Lake Starnberg, Ammersee and the Bavarian part of Lake Constance.

Since 1949, the preservation of the concentration camp cemeteries in Bavaria belongs to the tasks of the administration.

References
 About us, Bavarian Palace Department
 Verordnung über die Bayerische Verwaltung der staatlichen Schlösser, Gärten und Seen (Regulation of Bavarian Administration of State-Owned Palaces, Gardens and Lakes). 14 December 2001.

External links
 Official homepage

Organisations based in Bavaria
Heritage registers in Germany